Chunvalia, or Chuvalia, Chunwalia is a subcaste of the Koli caste found in the Indian state of Gujarat. The Chunvalia Kolis were the first Indian caste to adopt the game of cricket in India. Chunvalia Kolis were classified as a Criminal Tribe under Criminal Tribes Act by government of the British Raj because of their purported anti-social behaviour and activities, such as alleged highway and gang robberies (dacoity), theft of animals and crops, murder and blackmail in Gujarat. During the First World War, Chunwalia Kolis were enlisted as soldiers in British Indian Army by the Bombay government of British India.

Origin 
The Chunvalia Kolis are said to be from forty-four villages (Chunvalis) of Chunval Pradesh of Gujarat. Their name may be from Chunval Pradesh which was ruled by Makwana Koli landlords. Chunvalia Kolis are mostly found in the Saurashtra region of Gujarat.

Clans 
Prominent clans of Chunvalia Kolis include:

 Makwana
 Varshdiya
 Jhala
 Dudakiya
 Degama
 Chauhan
 Kathechia
 Kobia
 Kararia
 Kagadia
 Dudhrejia
 Derwaria
 Parmar
 Baria
 Surela
 Kansagra
 Thakor
 Kanjariya
 Koladra
 Kordia
 Masen
 Indria
 Kukadia
 Karelia
 Chawda
 Jhinjhuwadia
 Dabhi
 Talsania
 Dudhrejia
 Detrola
 Shihora
 Padalia
 Panchsara
 Panaria
 Balolia
 Rojasra
 Santola
 Kansagra
 Kuretia
 Sarla
 Sarwala
 Barania
 Vadhlegia
 Unatia
 Wadesa
 Rodatla
 Khawadia
 Savadia
 Ranwadia
 Nandesalia
 Khokhalia
 Katosna
 Udesa
 Dadhrecha
 Vastapra
 Ughrejia
 Sitapra.
 solgama

Titles 
Here are list of titles used by Chunvalia Kolis of Gujarat:
 Thakor, used by Chunvalia Kolis who ruled over any principalities or was chief of villages or rich and high koli families.
 Pagi, used by Chunvalia Kolis who served as a detective for rulers or any chief.
 Girasia, used by royal chunvalia kolis who ruled or controlled a Giras (jagir of Villages) granted by any ruler or chief

History 
During the reign of Gujarat Sultanate, the Chunvalia Kolis under their chief or petty ruler were most turbulent caste and plundered the villages inhabited by Muslims. They killed the Viceroy of the Sultanate, so Sahib Khan was appointed as Viceroy but he was displaced by Azam Khan because the depredations of Kolis had become frequent during weak Viceroy Sahib Khan. At this time Shaista Khan marched against and defeated the Chunwalia Kolis, who, since Azam Khan’s time, had been ravaging the villages round Ahmadabad as well as those of Dholka, Kadi and Viramgam.

In 1814, there was a general unrest in Gogha between the superior and inferior landowners owing to an unequal value of land revenue assessment and the haughty attitude of land proprietors and as a result an unceasing struggle was going on between them. So Chuvalia Koli chiefs attacked and plundered the villages and created a disturbance in British-controlled territory. They again revolted in northeast of Ahmedabad district in 1819, 1824 and 1825. The Colonial State sent troops to suppress the Koli revolt and the Koli Jagirdars were forced to give securities to villagers. Chuvalia Kolis also made disorder in the Daskroi Taluka, Viramgam and Prantij before they were once again suppressed.

The Chunvalia Kolis were agriculturists. In 19th century, they troubled the government of the British Raj much more because of their antisocial activities; the Bombay Presidency government sent troops of the British Indian Army to control the Chunvalia Kolis; they tackled the troops valiantly. The Chunvalia Kolis were labelled an outlaw caste of Gujarat. The Chunvalia Kolis were once known for their criminal activities but today are mainly engaged in cultivation.

In Baroda State, Chunvalia Kolis are mostly found in the Kadi district. Fifty years ago, they were the terror of North Gujarat. Led by their chiefs, Thakardas or Girasias, they lived in villages protected by impassable thorn fences from where levied contributions from the districts round.

Classification 
The Chunvalia Kolis are classified as a Other Backward Class (OBC) caste by Government of Gujarat and are traditionally non-vegetarian.

References 

Koli subcastes